Tibetan Braille is the braille alphabet for writing the Tibetan language. It was invented in 1992 by German socialworker Sabriye Tenberken. It is based on German braille, with some extensions from international usage. As in print, the vowel a is not written.

Despite Tibetan and Dzongkha (Bhutanese) using the same alphabet in print, Tibetan Braille differs significantly from Dzongkha Braille, which is closer to international norms.

Alphabet
Tibetan Braille follows print orthography. (See Tibetan script.) This is often a poor match for how words are pronounced. Each syllable is rendered in the following order:

pre-consonant, superscript consonant, head consonant, subscript consonant, vowel, post-consonant(s)

The invariable consonants are:

Several consonants, wa, ya, ra, la, and sa, are provided with forms corresponding to the superscript and subscript positions in print:

The assignments for zh and z also match international conventions, as those letters are pronounced like sh and s. Several of the assignments which do not match international braille have the values of German Braille:  ch for c (ch),  j for y ,  z  for tsh,  s  for z,  sch  for sh ,  ß  for s. Letters which are not basic to the German alphabet (c, q, x, y) have been reassigned. Several of the aspirated consonants (ch, th, ph) are equivalent to the corresponding unaspirated consonant with an extra dot in the third row.

The short vowel "a" is inherent in the head (main) consonant, and is not written explicitly. When a vowel occurs at the beginning of a word, it is carried by a null consonant ཨ :

Numbers and punctuation
Digits are as in English Braille.  Basic punctuation:

References

French-ordered braille alphabets
Tibetan language
1992 introductions